The Shadow Ministry of Chris Minns is the Labor opposition since June 2021, opposing the Berejiklian and Perrottet governments in the Parliament of New South Wales. It is led by Chris Minns following his election as leader of the party and NSW Leader of the Opposition on 4 June 2021. Other leadership positions including the deputy party leader, leader and deputy leader of the opposition in the Legislative Council were confirmed on 8 June 2021. The rest of the shadow ministry was subsequently announced by Minns on 11 June 2021, effective the following day.

The shadow cabinet is made up of 25 members of the NSW Labor caucus.

Shadow cabinet

Other Positions

Former Members of the Shadow Cabinet
Two members of the shadow cabinet left their positions in 2022.

See also

2023 New South Wales state election
Second Berejiklian ministry
First Perrottet ministry
Second Perrottet ministry
Shadow Ministry of Jodi McKay

References

Minns
Australian Labor Party